Mumps is a viral disease.

Mumps or MUMPS may also refer to:

Places
 Oldham Mumps, a district in Oldham, Greater Manchester
 Oldham Mumps railway station, a railway station on the Oldham Loop Line, now converted to Manchester Metrolink and known as Oldham Mumps Metrolink station

Art, entertainment, and media
 Mumps, an unwanted optical effect in Cinemascope films, in which an actor's face appears to stretch horizontally as the face gets in closer to the camera
 Mumps (rock band), a band led by Lance Loud

Computing
 MUMPS (software), a numeric linear algebra software for parallel computers
 MUMPS (or M), a computer programming language